Spurius Tarpeius is a mythological/historical character. He was the commander of the Roman citadel under King Romulus. His daughter, Tarpeia, betrayed the city to the fathers of the kidnapped Sabine women and asked for everything the Sabine warriors had on their left arms: it is thought Sabine warriors had gold bracelets and rings on their left arms. However, they crushed her with the shields they had on their left arms instead.

See also
Rape of the Sabine Women

Sources
 
 Sanders HA. The Myth about Tarpeia in Roman Historical Sources and Institutions  Volume 1 of Studies: Humanistic series, University of Michigan. Macmillan, 1903. pages 1-47. 

8th-century BC Romans